Franco Ortolani (29 August 1943 – 22 November 2019) was an Italian politician who served in the Italian Senate for the Five Star Movement from 2018 to 2019.

Career 
Ortolani was a candidate for the Five Star Movement in the 2018 general election and was elected in Naples with winning over 100,000 votes.

Death 
He died from cancer in Rome in the night of 22 November 2019. He was succeeded in a by-election in 2020 by Sandro Ruotolo of the centre-left coalition.

References 

1943 births
2019 deaths
Members of the Italian Senate from Campania
Politicians from Naples
University of Naples Federico II alumni
Senators of Legislature XVIII of Italy
Deaths from cancer in Lazio
Five Star Movement politicians
Italian academics